Almon Victor Roache (born September 17, 1991) is an American professional baseball outfielder who is currently a free agent.

Early life and career
Roache was born in Ypsilanti, Michigan. He participated in Reviving Baseball in Inner Cities and attended Lincoln High School in Ypsilanti. He was drafted in the 25th round of the 2009 MLB Draft by the Detroit Tigers but did not sign and chose to play for the Georgia Southern Eagles baseball team.

During the 2011 season, Roache hit 30 home runs, up from 8 home runs the previous season. It was the largest jump in NCAA baseball and against a trend of declining power production due to the introduction of new baseball bats in NCAA baseball. He was named to the first team of Baseball America's College All-America Team. After the 2011 season, he played collegiate summer baseball with the Cotuit Kettleers of the Cape Cod Baseball League, was named a league all-star, and received the league's Outstanding Pro Prospect award. In December 2011, Roache was named a preseason All-America First Team by the Baseball Writers' Association of America.

On February 25, 2012, Roache broke his left wrist making a diving play in right field and missed the remainder of the 2012 season.  Prior to fracturing his wrist, Roache was hitting .412 with 5 RBI and two home runs.

Professional career

Milwaukee Brewers
The Milwaukee Brewers selected Roache in the first round, with the 28th overall selection, in the 2012 MLB Draft. He made his professional debut on April 21, 2013 for the Wisconsin Timber Rattlers. He spent all of 2013 with Wisconsin where he batted .248 with 22 home runs and 74 RBIs in 119 games. He spent the 2014 season with the Brevard County Manatees. On May 4, 2014, Roache hit the first three home run game in Brevard County history against Clearwater. In 122 games for the Manatees, he slashed .226/.298/.400 with 18 home runs and 54 RBIs.

In 2015, he played for both Brevard County and the Biloxi Shuckers, compiling a .253 batting average with 18 home runs and 71 RBIs in 130 games between both teams, and in 2016, he played with Biloxi where he batted .243 with four home runs and 15 RBIs in only 51 games due to injury.
Roache began the 2017 season with Biloxi.

Los Angeles Dodgers
He was traded to the Los Angeles Dodgers for a player to be named later on May 4. He was released by the Dodgers in August after spending most of the season with the Rancho Cucamonga Quakes. In 57 games between Biloxi and Rancho Cucamonga, he batted .186 with six home runs and 25 RBIs.

St Louis Cardinals
In February 2018, Roache signed a minor league deal with the St. Louis Cardinals. They assigned him to the Springfield Cardinals to start the season. He was released at the end of the season.

Chicago Dogs
On February 27, 2019, Roache signed with the Chicago Dogs of the independent American Association.

On March 12, 2020, Roache re-signed with the Dogs. On February 2, 2021, Roache was released.

References

External links

1991 births
Living people
African-American baseball players
All-American college baseball players
Baseball outfielders
Baseball players from Michigan
Biloxi Shuckers players
Brevard County Manatees players
Chicago Dogs players
Cotuit Kettleers players
Georgia Southern Eagles baseball players
Memphis Redbirds players
Rancho Cucamonga Quakes players
Sportspeople from Ypsilanti, Michigan
Springfield Cardinals players
Wisconsin Timber Rattlers players
21st-century African-American sportspeople